The 2007 FAW Premier Cup Final was the final of the 10th season of the FAW Premier Cup. The final was played at Newport Stadium in Newport on 21 March 2007 and marked the first time the final has been staged at the stadium. The match was contested by Newport County and The New Saints.

Route to the final

Newport County
Newport County scores are shown first in every match

The New Saints
The New Saints scores are shown first in every match

Match

2007
Finals
Newport County A.F.C. matches